Tobruk is a 1967 American drama war film directed by Arthur Hiller and starring Rock Hudson and George Peppard. The film was written by Leo Gordon (who also acted in the film) and released through Universal Pictures.

Set in North Africa during the North African Campaign of World War II, it is a fictionalized story of members of the British Army's Long Range Desert Group (LRDG) and the Special Identification Group (SIG) who endeavour to destroy the fuel bunkers of Generalfeldmarschall Erwin Rommel's Panzer Army Africa in Tobruk. The film is loosely based on the British attacks on Italian and German forces at Tobruk codenamed "Operation Agreement". The film depicts the operation as being successful, although actually Operation Agreement was a disastrous failure.

Plot
In September 1942, Rommel's Africa Korps is only 90 miles (144 km) from the Suez Canal, but running dangerously low on fuel. The British approve a plan to destroy German fuel bunkers at Tobruk in an attempt to cripple Rommel's attack.

The author of the plan, Canadian-born Major Donald Craig (Rock Hudson) of the Long Range Desert Group (LRDG) had been captured by Vichy French forces and is held prisoner, along with captured Italian Army soldiers, on a ship in the port of the French city of Algiers. As his expertise is considered essential to the success of the raid, Craig is rescued by Captain Kurt Bergman (George Peppard) of the Special Identification Group (SIG) and some of his men, German Jews serving with the British. They then join up with commandos of the Long Range Desert Group, under the command of Lieutenant-Colonel John Harker (Nigel Green), at Kufra in southeastern Libya.

Colonel Harker explains they have eight days to get to Tobruk and destroy the fuel depot and German fortress artillery pieces protecting the harbour, before a scheduled amphibious landing and a bombing raid on the city by the Royal Air Force (RAF). They are to drive there through enemy territory posing as prisoners of war escorted by the SIG pretending to be guards. Once they reach Tobruk they would then link up with a full British naval and RAF assault on the city and their primary objective, Rommel's underground fuel bunkers.

Craig is highly skeptical of the operation, claiming that "Staff has a genius for sitting on its brains and coming up with perfect hindsight", stating that "When I submitted the plan we could have blown up the fuel bunkers with a handful of men. How in hell are we supposed to get through their defenses now?" While warning Craig not to let personal differences of opinion interfere with the operation, Colonel Harker also reveals that he was the genius with perfect hindsight who convinced Staff to approve Craig's original plan which would now be "maximum effort, land, sea and air".

On the way, they encounter a patrol of Italian tanks, which stops a short distance from where they are resting in a gully. Later that night, Sergeant Major Jack Tyne (Jack Watson) spots a tank column approaching from the opposite direction. After Bergman and three of his men kill the Italian sentries, Colonel Harker, surmising that the approaching column "must be German -- the Italians are too fond of comfort to travel this late", tricks the two units into attacking each other by firing mortars, first at the Germans and then the Italians, enabling the raiders to sneak away.

To avoid detection the next day, Craig safely guides them through a German mine field, before they are attacked by a British Curtiss P-40 Warhawk fighter. They manage to shoot it down, but eight men are killed and one troop transport truck, their auxiliary fuel supply, and both of their radios are destroyed. The fighting attracts Tuareg tribesmen, who are friendly with the Germans. Craig, who speaks their language, exchanges some guns and ammunition for two prisoners.

The prisoners turn out to be British traitors Henry Portman (Liam Redmond), who has an Irish accent, and his daughter Cheryl (Heidy Hunt), who were shot down while flying from Benghazi to Cairo. They have papers signed by the Grand Mufti of Jerusalem (Mohammad Amin al-Husayni) and German Field Marshal Albert Kesselring: an agreement for "a group of important" Egyptian army officers to rise up against the British in a "holy war." The belief of the Germans is with Egypt conquered other Muslim, former Ottoman Empire states such as Turkey will then side with the Axis; Cheryl Portman states that the "Turks, alone, could put four million men into the war against the Soviet Union."

That night, the Portmans are told by a mysterious SIG member about the British masquerade and where to find a gun and a map to an underground telephone cable nearby where they can contact German command in Tobruk and alert them to the British column and upcoming attack. When they reach the telephone, however, they are spotted by an Italian patrol. Henry Portman fires at the patrol and is killed, while his daughter is seriously wounded.

Harker sends Bergman and Sergeant Krug (Leo Gordon) after the Portmans where they retrieve Cheryl from the Italians. When Krug asks how they knew about the telephone, Bergman replies, "Very simple. One among us is the enemy". Harker has Bergman and his men disarmed and then gives Bergman two hours to identify his traitor. The traitor kills Cheryl Portman so she cannot reveal his identity. Lieutenant Max Mohnfeld (Guy Stockwell), Bergman's second in command, appears from the tunnel the Portmans used to escape. He states the traitor is down the shaft. They find Corporal Bruckner (Robert Wolders), one of Bergman's closest friends for ten years, stabbed to death. Cheryl Portman had died from cyanide, and Bruckner's suicide tablet is missing. Bergman, however, is not convinced his friend was the traitor.

The group passes through checkpoints just outside Tobruk and after traveling through the city, they discover to their surprise that Rommel has amassed his total reserve strength at Tobruk undetected: two full panzer divisions. The discovery of Rommel's tanks puts the planned Naval assault in jeopardy, though without their radios the group have no way of warning Staff without taking the German transmitter located in the city which would alert the Germans.

The RAF then bomb Tobruk as scheduled. The LRDG blow up two of the harbour guns, and Harker orders Sergeant Major Tyne to signal the ships to abort the landing before the German tanks, which have pinned down Harker's troops, can "cut them to pieces". Harker also orders Lieutenant Boyden (Anthony Ashdown) to capture the German transmitter in the city in order to abort the landing and inform Staff of the Kesselring document. However, Boyden is killed during the bombing raid, as are Privates Alfie (Norman Rossington) and Dolan (Percy Herbert) when they discover millions in English pound notes the Germans had taken after capturing Tobruk from the British and attempt to steal the money (thereby making the German soldiers who kill them mistake them for looters and deserters). Meanwhile Mohnfeld, who volunteered to join them as Lt. Boyden did not speak German, is knocked out.

Bergman and three of his men escape on sidecar motorcycles and manage to destroy a tank and use flame throwers to buy Harker time; however, Bergman and his men are eventually killed. Meanwhile, Craig, Krug, and two other SIG men use the distraction to escape and seize a German tank well inland. After they use the tank to destroy the fuel depot, Harker and his men surrender.

After surrendering, Mohnfeld then appears where he reveals that he is really a German intelligence officer named von Kruger, explaining that he had told the truth the night before, only altering that "The Jew found me in the tunnel" and asks Harker for the Kesselring document. However, upon seeing the destruction of the fuel bunkers, Harker had burned the paper knowing its importance to the Germans. Harker then kills von Kruger with his pistol and is himself shot dead.

Craig, Krug and the two others manage to escape and exhausted after traveling over 70 miles on foot, make it to a scheduled back up rendezvous with a Royal Navy ship at Sallum just over the Egyptian border.

Cast
In order of appearance

 Rock Hudson as Maj. Donald Craig
 George Peppard as Capt. Bergman
 Nigel Green as Col. Harker
 Guy Stockwell as Lt. Mohnfeld
 Jack Watson as Sgt. Maj. Tyne
 Percy Herbert as Dolan
 Norman Rossington as Alfie
 Liam Redmond as Henry Portman
 Heidy Hunt as Cheryl Portman
 Leo Gordon as Sgt. Krug
 Robert Wolders as Corporal Bruckner
 Anthony Ashdown as L.t. Boyden
 Curt Lowens as German Colonel 
 Rico Cattani as Col. Stuhler
 Peter Coe as Tuareg Chieftain
 Lawrence Montaigne as Italian Officer 
 Bob Hoy as British Corporal
 Phil Adams as S.I.G. Bicker
 Ronnie Rondall Jr. as S.I.G. Schell

Production

Development
The film was based on an original script by Leo Gordon, who also worked as an actor. Gordon took the script to producer Gene Corman, who he had worked with several times before. Corman originally intended to make the film on a relatively low budget, around a million dollars, for United Artists – he had just made The Secret Invasion (1964) for that studio.

The scope of the film changed when Corman discovered Rock Hudson, then one of the biggest stars in the world, was about to leave his home studio of Universal because he was unhappy with the roles he had been playing (he had just signed to make Seconds at Paramount). Corman showed the script to Hudson who liked it, and he succeeded in getting the film financed at Universal, who wanted to keep Hudson within its fold. The film was a co production between Universal, Gibraltar Productions (Rock Hudson's company), and the Corman Co.

The film was known at one stage as The Cliffs at Mersa and The Cliffs. Hudson came on board in May 1965 (he would make it after Blindfold and Seconds) and Peppard was signed to co star with Hudson in July 1965, at a fee of $400,000.

Laurence Harvey was originally slated to play the role of Major Craig, while Dirk Bogarde was originally offered the role of Colonel Harker, but he declined.

Corman approached John Huston to direct who was interested. However, he wanted a fee of $500,000 and Universal was reluctant to use the director considering his recent films had been commercial failures. The job of directing eventually went to Arthur Hiller.

Corman budgeted the film at two-and-a-half million dollars. Universal felt it should be made for $5 million, but Corman was reluctant to make the movie for that much. His own fee was $200,000 while Gordon was paid $40,000 for his script. Corman wanted to shoot the film in North Africa with studio work done in England; however, Universal insisted it be shot in America as the studio was reluctant to film in Europe again after A Man Could Get Killed (also known as Welcome Mr. Beddoes) went over budget.

Gordon wrote himself a role as Sgt Tyne. Gordon normally played characters who died and wrote the script so Tyne did not die. Corman agreed to Gordon playing a role but only if the script was changed so Tyne died. Gordon instead decided to play the character of Krug, who lived.

Corman later commentated that Gordon "was a very witty, interesting conversationalist. His appearance probably worked to his disadvantage because to have him walk into a story conference was somewhat intimidating! I remember on Tobruk having director Arthur Hiller, who is a fey, gentle soul, taken aback when he met Leo – it took two or three story conferences before he could come to grips with that size and bulk."

Shooting
It was photographed in Technicolor using the Techniscope format, and shot in Almería, Spain and the Glamis Sand Dunes in the Imperial Valley, of southern California in the United States. The film had a budget of US$6 million.

Technical advice and assistance was provided by the 40th Armored Division ("Grizzly") of the California Army National Guard.

In the convoy heading to Tobruk the trucks used are actually M135 and M54, while the Sd.Kfz. 7's are American M3 halftracks with altered bodies. The tanks in the Italian column are in fact M48 Pattons.

Producer Gene Corman would again use Tobruk's Nazi occupation as the background in his 1990 parody film A Man Called Sarge, although this time set during the Second Battle of El Alamein, in late 1942.

Use of footage
The 1971 war film Raid on Rommel, directed by Henry Hathaway and starring Richard Burton, made extensive use of combat footage from Tobruk and also featured a very similar story-line about a British commando force infiltrating enemy lines and raiding the Afrika Korps supply bases.

Academy Awards
Albert Whitlock and Howard A. Anderson were nominated for the Academy Award for Best Visual Effects.

Home media availability
Universal first released this film on VHS on April 23, 1992 and again on May 15, 2002 in pan-and-scan format. It was released on DVD on June 12, 2012 as part of the made-on-demand Universal Vault Series. On January 21, 2020, Tobruk was released on Blu-ray by Kino International under its subsidiary "Kino Lorber Studio Classics" with licensing by Universal Pictures.

The R1 DVD release has no optional English subtitles and thus, the non-English dialogue in the film is not translated. The Blu-ray contains optional English subtitles with limited non-English ones during certain scenes and dialogue; the film's theatrical trailer is also included as a bonus feature (in pan-and-scan format).

There are also various Region 2 DVD and Region B Blu-ray releases.

Comics adaptation
Oliver Passingham adapted the film into a comic book version, published by the Lion Summer Spectacular.

See also
 List of American films of 1967
 The Desert Rats (film) (1953 film)
 Raid on Rommel (1971 film)
 Tobruk (2008 film) (2008 film)

References

Notes

External links 
 
 
 
https://www.theguardian.com/film/filmblog/2013/mar/21/tobruk-reel-history

1967 films
1967 war films
American war films
Films directed by Arthur Hiller
Universal Pictures films
North African campaign films
Films set in Libya
Films produced by Gene Corman
Films shot in Almería
War adventure films
Films scored by Bronisław Kaper
Films adapted into comics
1960s English-language films
1960s American films
Films about the British Army